The 1989 NCAA Division I-AA Football Championship Game was a postseason college football game between the Georgia Southern Eagles and the Stephen F. Austin Lumberjacks. The game was played on December 16, 1989, at Paulson Stadium in Statesboro, Georgia. The culminating game of the 1989 NCAA Division I-AA football season, it was won by Georgia Southern, 37–34.

Teams
The participants of the Championship Game were the finalists of the 1989 I-AA Playoffs, which began with a 16-team bracket. The location of the final, the Georgia Southern Eagles' Paulson Stadium, had been predetermined via a three-year agreement the university reached with the NCAA in February 1989.

Georgia Southern Eagles

Georgia Southern finished their regular season with an 11–0 record. Ranked first in the final NCAA I-AA in-house poll and seeded first in the tournament, the Eagles defeated Villanova, Middle Tennessee State, and Montana to reach the final. This was the fourth appearance for Georgia Southern in a Division I-AA championship game, having two prior wins (1985 and 1986) and one prior loss (1988).

Stephen F. Austin Lumberjacks

Stephen F. Austin finished their regular season with a 9–1–1 record (5–0–1 in conference); their only loss was an away game against Boise State. Ranked third in the final NCAA I-AA in-house poll and seeded third in the tournament, the Lumberjacks defeated Grambling State, Southwest Missouri State, and second-seed Furman to reach the final. This was the first appearance for Stephen F. Austin in a Division I-AA championship game.

Game summary

Scoring summary

Game statistics

References

Further reading

External links
 1989 I-AA National Championship - Stephen F. Austin vs Georgia Southern via YouTube

Championship Game
NCAA Division I Football Championship Games
Georgia Southern Eagles football games
Stephen F. Austin Lumberjacks football games
American football in Georgia (U.S. state)
Sports competitions in Georgia (U.S. state)
NCAA Division I-AA Football Championship Game
NCAA Division I-AA Football Championship Game